William A. Barnhill (November 26, 1889 – December 7, 1987) was an American photographer best known for his work in the Appalachian Mountains of western North Carolina in the early 1900s.  His love of hiking and photography took him to the mountains of western North Carolina between 1914 and 1917. The photographs he took during those trips have been featured in American Heritage and Life magazines, as well as in the collections of the Library of Congress, the New York Public Library, the Pack Memorial Public Library of Asheville, North Carolina, and various college libraries.
During World War I, as a Lieutenant in the US Army he commanded a photographic section in the 91st Aero Squadron.
Some of his photographs from the war were used in the New York Times during the war. 
He worked as a commercial photographer in Asheville and Cleveland after the war.

References

External links 
 Library of Congress Barnhill photographs of pioneer life in western North Carolina, 1914-1917
 New York Public Library - Romana Javitz Collection MFZ (Barnhill) 93-6189; Views of pottery making and sorghum molasses making, ca. 1900s, in North Carolina, cityscapes of Cleveland, Ohio and landscapes of a covered bridge near Mechanicsville, Ohio, ca. 1930s, and landscapes of the Delaware & Raritan Canal in Pennsylvania, ca. 1910. [graphic]
 Asheville--the mountains, the people : an historical photographic collection / edited by Edward Epstein, John Toms, and Peter Vari of the Asheville-Buncombe Library System. Featuring photograph by William A. Barnhill and others
 Life Magazine Oct 16, 1970 A two-page spread of Barnhill's photograph of an Appalachian family carding, spinning, and weaving wool
 American Heritage February 1969 Richard M. Ketchum, "Appalachia 1914," American Heritage 20 (Feb. 1969): 26-41, 85.
 Search Pack Memorial Library Collection for Images by Barnhill
 Photos by William A. Barnhill
 Byways of Cleveland (1939), a collection of 61 photographs by Barnhill available on the Cleveland Public Library Digital Gallery

Appalachian studies
American photographers